This article lists the Ottoman military governors of Belgrade Fortress from the establishment of the autonomous Principality of Serbia in 1817, after the Second Serbian Uprising, until the withdrawal of Ottoman military garrison from Belgrade Fortress in 1867, simultaneously with the withdrawal of other remaining Ottoman garrisons from Serbian fortresses (namely Šabac, Smederevo, Kladovo, Užice and Soko Grad).

List
Marashli Ali Pasha (6 November 1817 – September 1821) 
Abdurrahman Pasha (September 1821 – 1827)
Hüseyin Pasha (1827–1833)
Vedyehi Veci Pasha (1833–1835)
Yusuf Muhlis Pasha (1835–1837) 
Hüshrev Pasha Samakuli (December 1837 – January 1841)
Haci Mehmed Kamil Pasha (January 1841 – October 1843)
Hafiz Mehmed Pasha (October 1843 – January 1846) 
Mehmed Vecihi Pasha (January 1846 – February 1847) 
Selim Sirri Pasha (February 1847 – July 1848)
Hafiz Ahmed Pasha (July 1848 – October 1848)
Hasan Pasha (October 1848 – May 1850)
Mehmed Vasif Pasha (May 1850 – April 1852)
Mehmed Hurshid Pasha (April 1852 – July 1852)
Mehmed Besim Pasha (July 1852 – February 1854)
Ahmed Izzet Pasha (February 1854 – January 1855)
Aziz Pasha (January 1855 – January 1857)
Hasan Hüsnü Pasha (January 1857 – July 1857)
Sherif Topal Osman Pasha (July 1857 – January 1861)
Hurshid Pasha (1861)
Reşid Pasha (April 1861 – 1863)
Eyub Pasha (1863–1864)
Ali Pasha (1865–1866)
Ali Reza Pasha (1866 – 19 April 1867)

See also
History of Belgrade
Timeline of Belgrade

Čukur Fountain incident

Sources
World Statesmen – Serbia

Belgrade Fortress military governors
Ottoman military governors of Belgrade Fortress
Ottoman military governors of Belgrade Fortress
Belgrade Fortress Ottoman military governors
Belgrade Fortress
 
Belgrade Fortress Ottoman military governors